Maheshtala College, established in 1971, is an undergraduate college in Maheshtala, West Bengal, India. It is affiliated with the University of Calcutta.

Departments

Science

Chemistry
Physics
Mathematics
Computer Science

Arts and Commerce

Bengali
English
Education
Sanskrit
History
Geography
Political Science
Philosophy
Economics
Journalism and Mass Communication
Commerce

Accreditation
The college is recognized by the University Grants Commission (UGC). It was accredited by the National Assessment and Accreditation Council (NAAC), and awarded C++ grade in 2004. It has been re-accredited in 2016 by NAAC and has awarded the grade B+

See also 
 University of Calcutta
 Budge Budge College
 Senate of Serampore College
List of colleges affiliated to the University of Calcutta
Education in India
Education in West Bengal

References

External links
Maheshtala College

Educational institutions established in 1971
University of Calcutta affiliates
Universities and colleges in South 24 Parganas district
1971 establishments in West Bengal